The 2006 Nottingham Open, also known as red letter DAYS Open- Nottingham for sponsorship reasons, was the 2006 edition of the Nottingham Open men's tennis tournament and played on outdoor grass courts. The tournament was part of the International Series of the 2006 ATP Tour. It was the 17th edition of the tournament and was held from 19 June through 24 June 2006. Richard Gasquet won the singles title.

Finals

Singles

 Richard Gasquet defeated  Jonas Björkman 6–4, 6–3
 It was Gasquet's 1st singles title of the year and the 2nd of his career.

Doubles

 Jonathan Erlich /  Andy Ram defeated  Igor Kunitsyn /  Dmitry Tursunov 6–3, 6–2

References

External links
 ITF – tournament edition details

Nottingham
Nottingham Open
2006 Nottingham Open